"Peculiar Hole in the Sky" is a song written by Harry Vanda and George Young. It was originally recorded by the Australian rock group the Easybeats in 1967, but left unreleased until 1969. The song would later be given to Australian rock group, The Valentines, which included singer Bon Scott, who would later join George Young's brothers Malcolm Young and Angus Young in AC/DC. The Valentines version would be released in August 1968.

Single track listing

Peculiar Hole in the Sky
Love Makes Sweet Music

Charts

The Easybeats version

The original recording by The Easybeats was released the lead single for the Albert Productions compilation album The Best of The Easybeats Volume 2. In an interview with GTK during their 1969 Australian tour, the band expressed that it was not their decision to release the single and drummer Tony Cahill stated, in reference to the singles poor sales, that "...if it had of been released 18 months ago, it still would have been hip". The song failed to reach the national top 40, but did chart with some Australian radio stations.

Tracklisting
Peculiar Hole in the Sky
H.P. Man

Charts

References

1968 singles
1969 singles
The Easybeats songs
Songs written by Harry Vanda
Songs written by George Young (rock musician)
Parlophone singles
Albert Productions singles
1968 songs